{{Infobox film
| name           = Ee Bandhana
| image          = 
| director       = Vijayalakshmi Singh
| producer       = 
| starring       = 
| story          = B.R. Chopra Achala Nagar Satish BhatnagarRam Govind Shafiq Ansari
| based_on       = Baghban by Ravi Chopra
| music          = Mano Murthy
| cinematography = Ajay Vincent
| editing        = B. S. Kemparaju
| studio         = Dakshath Combines
| distributor    = 
| country        = India
| language       = Kannada
| runtime        = 170 minutes
| released       = 
}}Ee Bandhana is a 2007 Indian Kannada-language drama film written, directed and co-produced by Vijayalakshmi Singh. This marks her debut directorial project. It stars Vishnuvardhan and Jayapradha. While Darshan, Ananth Nag, Tara, Sharmiela Mandre, Tarun Chandra and Jennifer Kotwal form the rest of the ensemble cast. The movie was produced by Jai Jagadish for Dakshath Combines.

The film is a remake of Hindi film Baghban (2003)  which was an unofficial adaptation 
of the 1937 Hollywood movie Make Way for Tomorrow which had earlier inspired the 1958 Kannada movie School Master. The music is scored by Mano Murthy and all the songs were received well. The film met with positive response from the critics.

Cast

 Vishnuvardhan as Harish Raj
 Jayapradha as Nandini
 Darshan as Kiran in an extended cameo appearance
 Ananth Nag as Narayana Ullagaddi
 Tara as Narayana Ullagaddi's wife/Sukanya (Sukku)
 Tarun Chandra as Kapil
 Sharmiela Mandre as Priya
 Jennifer Kotwal as Pallavi in an extended cameo appearance
 Jai Jagadish as Balachander
 Doddanna as Siddarama
 Shivaram as Govinda
 Raghu Samarth
 Madhu Hegde
 Ashwath Neenasam
 Arundhathi Jatkar
 Vaibhavi
 Nayanshekar

Soundtrack
The music of the film was composed by Mano Murthy. The audio album was released in September 2007 and was extremely well received. The songs "Lets Dance" and "Adhe Bhoomi" were huge hits.

Release and reception
The film was schehudlded to release on 9 November 2007, but it was delayed.Ee Bandhana'' received generally positive reviews from film critics upon its release. The lead actors Vishnuvardhan and Jayapradha were garnered with best performances by all the critics. Darshan's special appearance was also lauded by most of the critics. Actors Ananth Nag and Tara too got critical appraisals for their portrayals. Sify.com rated the movie 3 stars and declared the film as "above average". Rediff.com lauded the technical team's effort and rated 3 out of 5 stars and commented that the film is "worth watching".

Awards 
 Filmfare Awards South
 Filmfare Award for Best Supporting Actress - Kannada - Tara

References

2007 films
2000s Kannada-language films
Indian drama films
Kannada remakes of Hindi films
Films scored by Mano Murthy
2007 directorial debut films
Films directed by Vijayalakshmi Singh